The 2006 Tour of Flanders was the 90th edition of the Tour of Flanders cycling classic, taking place on 2 April 2006. World champion and last year's winner Tom Boonen was the favourite before the start and he won the second time in a row. He won the sprint from Leif Hoste, after both escaped 33 km before the finish.

General standings

02-04-2006: Brugge-Ninove, 258 km

References

External links
Race website

2006
Tour of Flanders
Tour of Flanders